= Lawn bowls national championships =

List of Lawm bowl national championships

These are the premier lawn bowls national championships.
